René Génin (25 January 1890 – 24 October 1967) was a French stage and film actor. He appeared in more than 130 films between 1931 and 1965.

Selected filmography

 The Brighton Twins (1936)
 27 Rue de la Paix (1936)
 Nights of Fire (1937)
 The Red Dancer (1937)
 Life Dances On (1937)
 The Man from Nowhere (1937)
 Port of Shadows (1938)
 Ernest the Rebel (1938)
 Ramuntcho (1938)
 Girls in Distress (1939)
 The Phantom Carriage (1939)
 Mademoiselle Swing (1942) 
 Patricia (1942)
 Pierre and Jean (1943)
 A Cage of Nightingales (1945)
 The Eleventh Hour Guest (1945)
 Pamela (1945)
 Majestic Hotel Cellars (1945)
 The Last Penny (1946)
 The Sea Rose (1946)
 Jericho (1946)
 The Lost Village (1947)
 Les Amants du pont Saint-Jean (1947)
 The Beautiful Trip (1947)
 The Farm of Seven Sins (1949)
 The Lovers Of Verona (1949)
 The Passenger (1949)
 God Needs Men (1950)
 The Atomic Monsieur Placido (1950)
 Blonde (1950)
 The Treasure of Cantenac (1950)
 Le Sabre de mon père (1951)
 Monsieur Octave (1951)
 Juliette, or Key of Dreams (1951)
 A Mother's Secret (1952)
 When Do You Commit Suicide? (1953)
 Forbidden Fruit (1952)
 The Sheep Has Five Legs (1954)
 Cadet Rousselle (1954)
 Paris, Palace Hotel (1956)
 The Law Is the Law (1958)
 Croesus (1960)
 Cocagne (1961)

References

External links

1890 births
1967 deaths
French male stage actors
French male film actors
People from Aix-en-Provence
20th-century French male actors